The 1913 Copa de Honor Cousenier was the final match to decide the winner of the Copa de Honor Cousenier, the 9th. edition of the international competition organised by the Argentine and Uruguayan Associations together. The final was contested by Uruguayan Club Nacional de Football and Argentine Racing Club de Avellaneda. 

The match was held in the Estadio Gran Parque Central in Montevideo, on November 16, 1913. As the match ended in a 2–2 tie, both association scheduled a playoff for December 8 in the same venue, where Racing beat Nacional 3–2, winning its first and only Copa Cousenier trophy.

Qualified teams 

Note

Match details

Final

Playoff 

|

|}

References

c
c
1912 in Argentine football
1912 in Uruguayan football